Conus antonioi is a species of sea snail, a marine gastropod mollusc in the family Conidae, the cone snails, cone shells or cones.

These snails are predatory and venomous. They are capable of "stinging" humans.

Description
The size of the shell attains 21 mm.

Distribution
This species occurs in the Atlantic Ocean off Boa Vista Island, Cape Verde.

References

 Puillandre N., Duda T.F., Meyer C., Olivera B.M. & Bouchet P. (2015). One, four or 100 genera? A new classification of the cone snails. Journal of Molluscan Studies. 81: 1-23

 

antonioi
Gastropods described in 2014
Gastropods of Cape Verde
Fauna of Boa Vista, Cape Verde